Synclera subtessellalis is a moth in the family Crambidae. It was described by Francis Walker in 1865. It is found in the Democratic Republic of the Congo (Katanga, North Kivu, East Kasai, West Kasai, Equateur) and India.

References

Moths described in 1865
Spilomelinae